Carmen Lizeth Valle Vea (born 16 July 1979) is a Mexican politician from the National Action Party. In 2012 she served as Deputy of the LXI Legislature of the Mexican Congress representing Sonora.

References

1979 births
Living people
Politicians from Sonora
Women members of the Chamber of Deputies (Mexico)
National Action Party (Mexico) politicians
21st-century Mexican politicians
21st-century Mexican women politicians
Deputies of the LXI Legislature of Mexico
Members of the Chamber of Deputies (Mexico) for Sonora